Lake Claire is a neighborhood on the east side of Atlanta, Georgia, United States, comprising approximately 1,200 homes. It is situated entirely in the DeKalb County side of the city, east of Candler Park, north of Kirkwood, west of Decatur, and south of Druid Hills.

There was never an actual body of water known as Lake Claire; rather, it was a shorthand for the intersection of Lakeshore and Claire Drives. The closest thing to a commercial district is the small strip bordering Candler Park at McLendon and Clifton.

Part of the neighborhood lies with the Candler Park Historic District, which has been listed on the National Register of Historic Places.

Education
Residents in Lake Claire are within Atlanta Public Schools.

Zoned schools include :
 Mary Lin Elementary School
 Samuel M. Inman Middle School|David T. Howard Middle School
 Midtown High School

External links
Lake Claire Neighbors
Lake Claire Land Trust
 Lake Claire Cohousing

Neighborhoods in Atlanta